Histura limosa is a species of moth of the family Tortricidae. It is found in Colombia. Its holotype is BMNH.

References

Moths described in 1912
Polyorthini